The sopranino saxophone is the second-smallest member of the saxophone family. It is tuned in the key of E, and sounds an octave higher than the alto saxophone. An F sopranino (an octave above the F alto (also called mezzo-soprano) saxophone) were described in Adolphe Sax's patent, but no known examples have ever been built.

The sopranino saxophone has a sweet sound and although it is one of the least common of the saxophones in regular use today, it is still being produced by several of the major musical manufacturing companies. Due to their small size, sopraninos are not usually curved like other saxophones. Orsi, however, does make curved sopranino saxophones.

The original patented saxophone family, as developed by Adolphe Sax, included Eb and Bb saxophones in the voices of sopranino, soprano, alto, tenor, baritone, bass, contrabass, and subcontrabass instruments (although he never built the last), as well as the same seven in C and F though only the soprano, alto, and tenor were ever made. Since the late 20th century, however, a B piccolo, or sopranissimo saxophone (called soprillo, and tuned a fifth above the sopranino) and a B subcontrabass instrument (called tubax, also made in C) have been developed by the German instrument maker Benedikt Eppelsheim. 

The most notable use of the sopranino is in the orchestral work Boléro by Maurice Ravel (although Ravel called for a "soprano saxophone in F", the part is usually performed on E sopranino). In recent years, rock band Violent Femmes have incorporated sopranino saxophone into the band's live performances as well as their newest albums. Saxophonist Blaise Garza plays a curved sopranino saxophone in the Violent Femmes' 2019 song "I'm Not Gonna Cry". Outside of classical and rock music, notable jazz and improvising musicians using this instrument include Carla Marciano, James Carter, Anthony Braxton, La Monte Young, Roscoe Mitchell, Christophe Monniot, Joseph Jarman, Paul McCandless, Lol Coxhill, Roger Frampton, Hans Koller, Wolfgang Fuchs, Douglas Ewart, Larry Ochs, Vinny Golia, Thomas Chapin, Martin Archer, Jon Irabagon, Massimo Falascone, Gianni Gebbia, and Ian Anderson (credited with having played the instrument on the Jethro Tull albums A Passion Play and War Child). The sopranino saxophone is also used in the six-member Nuclear Whales Saxophone Orchestra, currently played by Kelley Hart Jenkins.

The sopranino saxophone's a range written range is from A#4/Bb4 to F7. This corresponds to C#4/Db4 concert (277.1826 Hertz) for the sopranino saxophone's bottom note, and G#6/Ab6 concert (1661.219 Hertz) for the sopranino saxophone's top note.

References

Saxophones
E-flat instruments